The 1993–94 season was the 48th season in FK Partizan's existence. This article shows player statistics and matches that the club played during the 1993–94 season.

Players

Squad information
players (league matches/league goals):  Nebojša Gudelj (34/4) Petar Vasiljević (34/2) Saša Ćurčić (33/7) Bratislav Mijalković (33/0) Savo Milošević (32/21) Dejan Čurović (32/19) Goran Pandurović (32/0) -goalkeeper- Branko Brnović (31/9) Dragan Ćirić (31/6) Albert Nađ (30/2) Zoran Mirković (26/0) Darko Tešović (24/4) Nenad Bjeković Jr. (19/4) Đorđe Tomić (18/1) Miroslav Čermelj (11/0) Gordan Petrić (10/1) sold to Dundee United during late fall 1993 Ljubomir Vorkapić (8/0) Đorđe Svetličić (5/0) Ivan Tomić (4/1) Saša Ilić (4/0) -goalkeeper- Dalibor Škorić (4/0) Saša Đuričić (2/0)

Competitions

First League of FR Yugoslavia

Matches

FR Yugoslavia Cup

See also
 List of FK Partizan seasons

References

External links
 Official website
 Partizanopedia 1993-94  (in Serbian)

FK Partizan seasons
Partizan
Serbian football championship-winning seasons